= Bandori, India =

Bandori बन्दोरी Bandauri
- village
- Location within Madhya Pradesh Location within India
- Coordinates: 23.0959607°N 77.4558554°E
- Country: India
- State: Madhya Pradesh
- District: Bhopal
- Tehsil: Huzur
- Elevation: 453 m (1,486 ft)

Population (2011)
  - Total: 408
- Time zone: UTC+5:30 (IST)
- ISO 3166 code: MP-IN
- 2011 census code: 482542

Bandori is a village in the Bhopal district of Madhya Pradesh, India. It is located in the Huzur tehsil and the Phanda block.

== Demographics ==
According to the 2011 census of India, Bandori has 104 households. The effective literacy rate (i.e. the literacy rate of population excluding children aged 6 and below) is 81.9%.

Demographics (2011 Census)
	Total	Male	Female
Population	408	223	185
Children aged below 6 years	60	38	22
Scheduled caste	19	11	8
Scheduled tribe	0	0	0
Literates	285	175	110
Workers (all)	236	126	110
Main workers (total)	83	74	9
Main workers: Cultivators	41	38	3
Main workers: Agricultural labourers	21	16	5
Main workers: Household industry workers	0	0	0
Main workers: Other	21	20	1
Marginal workers (total)	153	52	101
Marginal workers: Cultivators	15	10	5
Marginal workers: Agricultural labourers	135	40	95
Marginal workers: Household industry workers	0	0	0
Marginal workers: Others	3	2	1
Non-workers	172	97	75
